The 2017 Tro-Bro Léon was a one-day road cycling race that took place on 17 April 2017. It was the 34th edition of the Tro-Bro Léon and was rated as a 1.1 event as part of the 2017 UCI Europe Tour. It was also the eighth event of the 2017 French Road Cycling Cup.

The race was won by Damien Gaudin.

Teams
Nineteen teams were invited to take part in the race. These included two UCI WorldTeams, eight UCI Professional Continental teams and nine UCI Continental teams.

Result

References

External links

2017 UCI Europe Tour
2017 in French sport
2017